Yousef Karami (born March 22, 1983, in Meyaneh, Iran) is an Iranian taekwondo athlete who competed in the Men's 80 kg at the 2004 Summer Olympics and won the bronze medal. He is also the 2003 world champion (in 78–84 kg). Karami also won gold in the 2006 Asian Games in 84 kg and in the 2010 Asian Games in 87 kg.

Yousef Karami was titled as the most talented sportsman in Taekwondo by the Korea head coach due to his brilliant performance in the 2003 world championship, where he astonished everyone. Karami won the title while he was only 20.

External links
 
 
 

Iranian male taekwondo practitioners
Olympic taekwondo practitioners of Iran
Olympic bronze medalists for Iran
Taekwondo practitioners at the 2004 Summer Olympics
Taekwondo practitioners at the 2012 Summer Olympics
People from Karaj
People from Mianeh
1983 births
Living people
Asian Games gold medalists for Iran
Olympic medalists in taekwondo
Asian Games medalists in taekwondo
Taekwondo practitioners at the 2002 Asian Games
Taekwondo practitioners at the 2006 Asian Games
Taekwondo practitioners at the 2010 Asian Games
Taekwondo practitioners at the 2014 Asian Games
Medalists at the 2004 Summer Olympics
Medalists at the 2006 Asian Games
Medalists at the 2010 Asian Games
Universiade medalists in taekwondo
Universiade gold medalists for Iran
World Taekwondo Championships medalists
Asian Taekwondo Championships medalists
Medalists at the 2007 Summer Universiade
20th-century Iranian people
21st-century Iranian people